Mulindi is a village in the Gicumbi District of the Northern Province, Rwanda.

There are many tea plantations in the area.

President Paul Kagame led the Rwandan Patriotic Front during the Rwandan Civil War from Mulindi. In December 2012 construction of the National Liberation Struggle Museum was started at the site of the Rwandan Patriotic Front headquarters from August 1992 to July 1994.

Matt Harding's favorite Where the Hell is Matt? 2006 clip was the kids in Mulindi dancing with him.

References

Northern Province, Rwanda